STE20-like serine/threonine-protein kinase is an enzyme that in humans is encoded by the SLK gene.

Interactions 

SLK (gene) has been shown to interact with PDZK1.

SLK is a mammalian gene located on chromosome 10. it has also been cloned in rats. There is a whole family of STE20 like protein kinases, which has been divided into three categories. the most important p21-activated kinase (PAK), germinal center kinases (GCK) and Pleckstrin homology domain containing PAK (PHPAK).  SLK gene plays an important role in development, termination and differentiation of cells and tissues. the main enzyme SLK gene produces is called Ste20-like kinases which was formerly known as Ste20-like serine/threonine protein kinase. the balanced expression of SLK gene is very essential for the correct development of body parts in all mammals. this enzyme is also involved in cell movement and cell cycle. The expression of SLK gene in germ line cell is regulated by phosphorylation of PLK1, which is another gene involved in mitosis. Ste20- like kinases manages the correct orientation of micro-tubules during inter-phase level of cell cycles. Underproduction of Ste20-like serine/threonine-protein kinases can result in micro-tubule fibers to detach from chromosomes. It also functions in activation/deactivation of apoptosis in cells, as well as organization and adhesion of cell to shape an appropriate organ.

References

Further reading